The Federation of Zionist Youth (FZY) is Britain's oldest Jewish, Zionist, pluralist youth movement, founded in 1910. It is affiliated with Young Judaea in the United States and the Hebrew Scouts movement in Israel. It runs weekly activities, political campaigns, year-long programmes and summer programmes for hundreds of young British Jews.

Ideologically, FZY's vision statement is: "The Jewish People, living in peace in the State of Israel as One Nation and as a Light Unto the Nations."

FZY's Jewish, Zionist, pluralist ideology is committed to four aims:
 Tarbut – Jewish culture
 Tzedaka – values of charity and righteousness
 Magen – defense of Jewish rights
 Aliyah nimshechet – moving to Israel and continuing to do good for the state

FZY Centenary Year

2009/2010 was FZY's centenary year and the movement celebrated 100 years since its founding. To commemorate the year the movement chose a new logo and organised a number of celebratory events.

Israel Tour
FZY is one of the UK's largest provider of Summer Israel Tours for post-GCSE teenagers. In Summer 2007 they took 480 teenagers to Israel on short term Summer programs.

References

External links
 The Federation of Zionist Youth

Jewish youth organizations
Youth organisations based in the United Kingdom
Youth organizations established in 1910
Zionist youth movements